Beyoğlu is a district on the European side of İstanbul, Turkey, separated from the old city (historic peninsula of Constantinople) by the Golden Horn. It was known as the region of Pera (Πέρα, meaning "Beyond" in Greek) surrounding the ancient coastal town Galata which faced Constantinople across the Horn. Beyoğlu continued to be named Pera during the Middle Ages and, in western languages, into the early 20th century.

According to the prevailing theory, the Turkish name of Pera, Beyoğlu, is a modification by folk etymology of the Venetian title of Bailo, whose mansion was the grandest structure in this quarter. The informal Turkish-language title Bey Oğlu (literally Son of a Bey) was originally used by the Ottoman Turks to describe Lodovico Gritti, Istanbul-born son of Andrea Gritti, who was the Venetian Bailo of Constantinople during the reign of Sultan Bayezid II (r. 1481–1512) and was later elected Doge of Venice in 1523. Bey Oğlu thus referred to Lodovico Gritti, who established close relations with the Sublime Porte, and whose mansion was near the present-day Taksim Square. Located further south in Beyoğlu and originally built in the early 16th century, the "Venetian Palace" was the seat of the Bailo. The original palace building was replaced by the existing one in 1781, which later became the Italian Embassy following Italian unification in 1861, and the Italian Consulate in 1923, when Ankara became the capital of the Republic of Turkey.

The district encompasses other neighborhoods located north of the Golden Horn, including Galata (the medieval Genoese citadel from which Beyoğlu itself originated, which is today known as Karaköy), Tophane, Cihangir, Şişhane, Tepebaşı, Tarlabaşı, Dolapdere and Kasımpaşa, and is connected to the old city center across the Golden Horn through the Galata Bridge, Atatürk Bridge and Golden Horn Metro Bridge. Beyoğlu is the most active art, entertainment and nightlife centre of Istanbul.

History 

The area now known as Beyoğlu has been inhabited since Byzas founded the City of Byzantium in the 7th century BC, and predates the founding of Constantinople. During the Byzantine era, Greek speaking inhabitants named the hillside covered with orchards Sykai (The Fig Orchard), or Peran en Sykais (The Fig Field on the Other Side), referring to the "other side" of the Golden Horn. As the Byzantine Empire grew, so did Constantinople and its environs. The northern side of the Golden Horn became built up as a suburb of Byzantium as early as the 5th century. In this period the area began to be called Galata, and Emperor Theodosius II (reigned 402–450) built a fortress. The Greeks believe that the name comes either from galatas (meaning "milkman"), as the area was used by shepherds in the early medieval period, or from the word Galatai (meaning "Gauls"), as the Celtic tribe of Gauls were thought to have camped here during the Hellenistic period before settling into Galatia in central Anatolia, becoming known as the Galatians. The inhabitants of Galatia are famous for the Epistle to the Galatians and the Dying Galatian statue. The name may have also derived from the Italian word Calata, meaning "downward slope", as Galata, formerly a colony of the Republic of Genoa between 1273 and 1453, stands on a hilltop that goes downwards to the sea.

Genoese and Venetian periods 
The area came to be the base of European merchants, particularly from Genoa and Venice, in what was then known as Pera. Following the Fourth Crusade in 1204, and during the Latin Empire of Constantinople (1204–1261), the Venetians became more prominent in Pera. The Dominican Church of St. Paul (1233), today known as the Arap Camii, is from this period.

In 1273 the Byzantine Emperor Michael VIII Palaiologos granted Pera to the Republic of Genoa in recognition of Genoa's support of the Empire after the Fourth Crusade and the sacking of Constantinople in 1204. Pera became a flourishing trade colony, ruled by a podestà.

The Genoese Palace (Palazzo del Comune) was built in 1316 by Montano de Marinis, the Podestà of Galata (Pera), and still remains today in ruins, near the Bankalar Caddesi (Banks Street) in Karaköy, along with its adjacent buildings and numerous Genoese houses from the early 14th century.

In 1348 the Genoese built the famous Galata Tower, one of the most prominent landmarks of Istanbul. Pera (Galata) remained under Genoese control until May 29, 1453, when it was conquered by the Ottomans along with the rest of the city, after the Siege of Constantinople.

During the Byzantine period, the Genoese Podestà ruled over the Italian community of Galata (Pera), which was mostly made up of the Genoese, Venetians, Tuscans and Ragusans.

Venice, Genoa's archrival, regained control in the strategic citadel of Galata (Pera), which they were forced to leave in 1261 when the Byzantines retook Constantinople and brought an end to the Latin Empire (1204–1261) that was established by Enrico Dandolo, the Doge of Venice.

Following the Turkish siege of Constantinople in 1453, during which the Genoese sided with the Byzantines and defended the city together with them, the Ottoman Sultan Mehmed II allowed the Genoese (who had fled to their colonies in the Aegean Sea such as Lesbos and Chios) to return to the city, but Galata was no longer run by a Genoese Podestà.

Venice immediately established political and commercial ties with the Ottoman Empire, and a Venetian Bailo was sent to Pera as an ambassador, during the Byzantine period. It was the Venetians who suggested Leonardo da Vinci to Bayezid II when the Sultan mentioned his intention to construct a bridge over the Golden Horn, and Leonardo designed his Galata Bridge in 1502.

The Bailo's seat was the "Venetian Palace", originally built in Beyoğlu in the early 16th century and replaced by the existing palace building in 1781; which later became the "Italian Embassy" after the unification of Italy in 1861, and the "Italian Consulate" in 1923, when Ankara became the new Turkish capital.

The Ottoman Empire had an interesting relationship with the Republic of Venice. Even though the two states often went to war over the control of East Mediterranean territories and islands, they were keen on restoring their trade pacts once the wars were over, such as the renewed trade pacts of 1479, 1503, 1522, 1540 and 1575 following major sea wars between the two sides. The Venetians were also the first Europeans to taste Ottoman delicacies such as coffee, centuries before other Europeans saw coffee beans for the first time in their lives during the Battle of Vienna in 1683. These encounters can be described as the beginning of today's rich "coffee culture" in both Venice (and later the rest of Italy) and Vienna.

Following the conquest of Constantinople and Pera in 1453, the coast and the low-lying areas were quickly settled by the Turks, but the European presence in the area did not end. Several Roman Catholic churches, as St. Anthony of Padua,  SS. Peter and Paul in Galata and St. Mary Draperis were established for the needs of the Levantine population.

Nineteenth-century 

During the 19th century it was again home to many European traders, and housed many embassies, especially along the Grande Rue de Péra (today İstiklâl Avenue). The presence of such a prominent European population - commonly referred to as Levantines - made it the most Westernized part of Constantinople, especially when compared to the Old City at the other side of the Golden Horn, and allowed for influxes of modern technology, fashion, and arts. Thus, Pera was one of the first parts of Constantinople to have telephone lines, electricity, trams, municipal government and even an underground railway, the Tünel, inaugurated in 1875 as the world's second subway line (after London's Underground) to carry the people of Pera up and down from the port of Galata and the nearby business and banking district of Karaköy, where the Bankalar Caddesi (Banks Street), the financial center of the Ottoman Empire, is located. The theatre, cinema, patisserie and café culture that still remains strong in Beyoğlu dates from this late Ottoman period. Shops like İnci, famous for its chocolate mousse and profiteroles, predate the founding of the republic and survived until recently.

Pera and Galata in the late 19th and early 20th centuries were a part of the Municipality of the Sixth Circle, established under the laws of 11 Jumada al-Thani (Djem. II) and 24 Shawwal (Chev.) 1274, in 1858; the organisation of the central city in the city walls, "Stamboul", was not affected by these laws. All of Constantinople was in the Prefecture of the City of Constantinople.

The foreign communities also built their own schools, many of which went on to educate the elite of future generations of Turks, and still survive today as some of the best schools in Istanbul (see list of schools in Istanbul).

The rapid modernization which took place in Europe and left Ottoman Turkey behind was symbolized by the differences between Beyoğlu, and the historic Turkish quarters such as Eminönü and Fatih across the Golden Horn, in the Old City. When the Ottoman sultans finally initiated a modernization program with the Edict of Tanzimat (Reorganization) in 1839, they started constructing numerous buildings in Pera that mixed traditional Ottoman styles with newer European ones.

In addition, Sultan Abdülmecid stopped living in the Topkapı Palace and built a new palace near Pera, called the Dolmabahçe Palace, which blended the Neo-Classical, Baroque and Rococo styles.

20th-21st centuries 

When the Ottoman Empire collapsed and the Turkish Republic was founded (during and after the First World War) Pera, which became known as Beyoğlu in English in the modern era, went into gradual decline. The decline accelerated with the departure of the large Greek population of Beyoğlu and adjacent Galata as a result of Turkish pressure over the Cyprus conflict, during the 1950s and 1960s. The widespread political violence between leftist and rightist groups which troubled Turkey in the late 1970s also severely affected the lifestyle of the district, and accelerated its decline with the flight of the middle-class citizens to newer suburban areas such as Levent and Yeşilköy.

By the late 1980s, many of the grandiose Neoclassical and Art Nouveau apartment-blocks, formerly the residences of the late Ottoman élite, became home to immigrants from the countryside. While Beyoğlu continued to enjoy a reputation for its cosmopolitan and sophisticated atmosphere until the 1940s and 1950s, by the 1980s the area had become economically and socially troubled.

The first decades of the 21st century have witnessed the rapid gentrification of these neighborhoods. Istiklal Avenue has once again become a destination for tourists, and formerly bohemian neighborhoods like Cihangir have once again become fashionable and quite expensive. Some 19th and early 20th century buildings have been tastefully restored, while others have been converted into mammoth luxury malls of dubious aesthetic value. As newer, more international and affluent residents have begun to creep down the hills into Tophane and Tarlabasi, disagreements with more conservative elements in the neighborhoods have become common.

The low-lying areas such as Tophane, Kasımpaşa and Karaköy, and the side-streets of the area consist of older buildings.

Infrastructure

Roads
Parallel to İstiklal Avenue runs the wide bi-directional boulevard named Tarlabaşı Caddesi, which carries most of the traffic through the area and was constructed in the 1980s. The streets on either side of this road contain historic buildings and churches. The once cosmopolitan areas surrounding them have deteriorated.

Culture

Foreigners, especially from Euro-Mediterranean and West European countries, have long resided in Beyoğlu. There is a cosmopolitan atmosphere in the heart of the district, where people from various cultures live in Cihangir and Gümüşsuyu. Beyoğlu also has a number of historical Tekkes and Türbes. Several Sufi orders, such as the Cihangirî (pronounced Jihangiri) order, were founded here.

Most of the consulates (former embassies until 1923, when Ankara became the new Turkish capital) are still in this area; the Italian, British, German, Greek, Russian, Dutch, and Swedish consulates are significant in terms of their history and architecture.

Beyoğlu is also home to many high schools like Galatasaray Lisesi, Deutsche Schule Istanbul, St. George's Austrian High School, Lycée Sainte Pulchérie, Liceo Italiano, Beyoğlu Anatolian High School, Beyoğlu Kız Lisesi, Zografeion Lyceum, Zappeion Lyceum, and numerous others.

The unique international art project United Buddy Bears was presented in Beyoðlu during the winter of 2004–2005.

Tourism 

Some of İstiklâl Avenue has a 19th-century metropolitan character, and the avenue is lined with Neoclassical and Art Nouveau buildings. The nostalgic tram which runs on İstiklal Avenue, between Taksim Square and Tünel, was also re-installed in the early 1990s with the aim of reviving the historic atmosphere of the district.

Some of the city's historic pubs and winehouses are located in the areas around İstiklal Avenue (İstiklal Caddesi) in Beyoğlu. The 19th century Çiçek Pasajı (literally Flower Passage in Turkish, or Cité de Péra in French, opened in 1876) on İstiklal Avenue can be described as a miniature version of the famous Galleria in Milan, Italy, and has rows of historic pubs, winehouses and restaurants. The site of Çiçek Pasajı was originally occupied by the Naum Theatre, which was burned during the great fire of Pera in 1870. The theatre was frequently visited by Sultans Abdülaziz and Abdülhamid II, and hosted Giuseppe Verdi's play Il Trovatore before the opera houses of Paris. After the fire of 1870, the theatre was purchased by the local Greek banker Hristaki Zoğrafos Efendi, and architect Kleanthis Zannos designed the current building, which was called Cité de Péra or Hristaki Pasajı in its early years. Yorgo'nun Meyhanesi (Yorgo's Winehouse) was the first winehouse to be opened in the passage. In 1908 the Ottoman Grand Vizier Sait Paşa purchased the building, and it became known as the Sait Paşa Passage. Following the Russian Revolution of 1917, many impoverished noble Russian women, including a Baroness, sold flowers here. By the 1940s the building was mostly occupied by flower shops, hence the present Turkish name Çiçek Pasajı (Flower Passage). Following the restoration of the building in 1988, it was reopened as a galleria of pubs and restaurants.

Pano, established by Panayotis Papadopoulos in 1898, and the neighbouring Viktor Levi, established in 1914, are among the oldest winehouses in the city and are located on Kalyoncu Kulluk Street near the British Consulate and Galatasaray Square. Cumhuriyet Meyhanesi (literally Republic Winehouse), renamed in the early 1930s but originally established in the early 1890s, is another popular historic winehouse and is located in the nearby Sahne Street, along with the Hazzopulo Winehouse, established in 1871, inside the Hazzopulo Pasajı which connects Sahne Street and Meşrutiyet Avenue. The famous Nevizade Street, which has rows of historic pubs next to each other, is also in this area. Other historic pubs are found in the areas around Tünel Pasajı and the nearby Asmalımescit Street. Some historic neighbourhoods around İstiklal Avenue have recently been recreated, such as Cezayir Street near Galatasaray High School, which became known as La Rue Française and has rows of francophone pubs, cafés and restaurants playing live French music. Artiste Terasse (Artist Teras) on Cezayir Street is a popular restaurant-bar which offers panoramic views of the Hagia Sophia, Topkapı Palace, Sultan Ahmed Mosque and Galata Tower.

Throughout Beyoğlu, there are many night clubs for all kinds of tastes. Babylon and Nu Pera are among the most popular European style night clubs and restaurants in the district, while Kemancı plays rock, hard rock and heavy metal. Maksim plays Oriental music, while Andon is a place where one can eat, drink and dance to the traditional Turkish music called fasıl. There are restaurants on the top of historic buildings with a view of the city, such as 360.  Asmalımescit Street has rows of traditional Turkish restaurants and Ocakbaşı (grill) houses, while the streets around the historic Balıkpazarı (Fish Market) is full of eateries offering seafood like fried mussels and calamari along with beer or rakı, or the traditional kokoreç. Beyoğlu also has many elegant pasaj (passages) from the 19th century, most of which have historic and classy chocolateries and patisseries, such the Markiz Pastanesi, along with many shops lining their alleys. There is also a wide range of fast-food restaurants in the district, of international chains such as McDonald's, Burger King, Domino's Pizza, Pizza Hut, etc.; as well as local Turkish chains, such as Simit Sarayı which serves simit (sesame-covered, ring-shaped pretzel bread) along with cheese and tea, or individual eateries such as döner kebab houses.

Apart from the hundreds of shops lining the streets and avenues of the district, there is also a business community. Odakule, a 1970s high rise building (the first "structural expressionism" style building in Turkey) is the headquarters of İstanbul Sanayi Odası (ISO) (Istanbul Chamber of Industry) and is located between İstiklal Avenue and Tepebaşı, next to the Pera Museum. Most of the upper floors of the buildings in Beyoğlu are office space, and small workshops are found on the side streets.

Landmarks 

Istanbul Modern, located near Karaköy Port on the Bosphorus, frequently hosts the exhibitions of renowned Turkish and foreign artists.

Pera Museum exhibits some of the works of art from the late Ottoman period, such as the Kaplumbağa Terbiyecisi (Turtle Trainer) by Osman Hamdi Bey. Apart from its permanent collection, the museum also hosts visiting exhibitions, which included the works of renowned artists such as Rembrandt.

Doğançay Museum, Turkey's first contemporary art museum dedicated to the works of a single artist, officially opened its doors to the public in 2004. While the museum almost exclusively displays the works of its founder Burhan Doğançay, a contemporary artists, one floor has been set aside for the works of the artist's father, Adil Doğançay.

Hotel Pera Palace was built in the district in 1892 for hosting the passengers of the Orient Express. Agatha Christie wrote the novel Murder on the Orient Express in this hotel. Her room is conserved as a museum.

S. Antonio di Padova, the largest Catholic church in Turkey, and the Neve Shalom Synagogue, the largest synagogue in Turkey, are also in Beyoğlu. There are other important Catholic and Orthodox churches in the area, such as the Saint Mary Draperis church or centrally located Hagia Triada Church at the conjunction point between Istiklal Avenue and Taksim Square. It is the seat of the Chaldean Catholic Archeparchy of Diyarbakir.

The only Jewish Museum of Turkey, which has been converted from a synagogue, is located in the Karaköy quarter, which was known as Galata in the medieval period.

İstiklal Avenue is also located in the historic Beyoğlu (Pera) district. The famous street with shops, cafes, cinemas and other venues stretches for 1.4 kilometres (0.87 mi) and hosts up to 3 million people each day.

The 1948-opened Atlas Cinema is situated in a 1877-built historic building at Istiklal Avenue.

Food and drink 

 Changa Restaurant
 Hacı Abdullah Restaurant
 Lebon Patisserie & Café
 Mikla Restaurant

Education

Primary and secondary schools in the district:
Deutsche Schule Istanbul
 Galatasaray High School
 Liceo Italiano di Istanbul
Lycée Français Pierre Loti d'Istanbul Beyoglu Campus
 St. George's Austrian High School

Universities
 Beykent University Taksim Campus
 Mimar Sinan Fine Arts University

The original campus of the Ottoman Imperial School of Medicine, established in 1827, was in Galatasaray, Pera. After a fire in 1848 it temporarily moved to the Golden Horn.

Lycée Saint-Joseph, Istanbul was in Pera after its establishment; its official founding year is 1870.

International relations 

In the Ottoman period the embassy of the United States to the Ottoman Empire was located in Pera.

Twin towns — sister cities 
Beyoğlu is twinned with:

 Benalmádena, Spain
 Bunkyō (Tokyo), Japan
 Centar (Skopje), North Macedonia
 Chengdu, China
 Chornomorsk, Ukraine
 Dubrovnik, Croatia
 Genoa, Italy
 Hebron, Palestine
 Mitte (Berlin), Germany
 Novi Grad (Sarajevo), Bosnia and Herzegovina
 Schaerbeek, Belgium
 Sector 1 (Bucharest), Romania
 Seongbuk (Seoul), South Korea
 Sidi Bernoussi (Casablanca), Morocco
 Tozeur, Tunisia
 Vitacura, Chile

Friendly cities 
 

 Catania, Italy
 Pécs, Hungary
 Dortmund, Germany
 Mannheim, Germany

Subdistricts and neighborhoods 
Sub-districts within Beyoğlu

 Ayaspaşa
 Azapkapı
 Çıksalın
 Çukurcuma
 Dolapdere
 Fındıklı
 Galata
 Galatasaray
 Hacıhüsrev
 Hasköy
 Kabataş
 Karaköy
 Kasımpaşa
 Kuledibi
 Şişhane
 Taksim
 Talimhane
 Tarlabaşı
 Tepebaşı
 Tophane
 Tünel

Neighborhoods within Beyoğlu:

 Arapcami
 Asmalı Mescit
 Bedrettin
 Bereketzade
 Bostan
 Bülbül
 Camiikebir
 Cihangir
 Çatma Mescit
 Çukur
 Emekyemez
 Evliya Çelebi
 Fetihtepe
 Firuzağa
 Gümüşsuyu
 Hacıahmet
 Hacımimi
 Halıcıoğlu
 Hüseyinağa
 İstiklal
 Kadımehmet Efendi
 Kalyoncu Kulluğu
 Kamer Hatun
 Kaptanpaşa
 Katip Mustafa Çelebi
 Keçecipiri
 Kemankeş Karamustafapaşa
 Kılıçalipaşa
 Kocatepe
 Kulaksız
 Kuloğlu
 Küçükpiyale
 Müeyyetzade
 Ömeravni
 Örnektepe
 Piripaşa
 Piyalepaşa
 Pürtelaş Hasan Efendi
 Sururi Mehmet Efendi
 Şahkulu
 Şehitmuhtar
 Sütlüce
 Tomtom
 Yahya Kâhya
 Yenişehir

See also 
 List of restaurant districts and streets
 Lebon Patisserie & Café

References

External links

Beyoğlu Municipality official website
Galata Tower
Pera Museum
Çiçek Pasajı - Cité de Péra
Tiyatro Pera - Pera Theater
Galatasaray High School

 
Populated places in Istanbul Province
Entertainment districts in Turkey
Restaurant districts and streets in Turkey
Districts of Istanbul Province